Sukë is a village and a former municipality in the Gjirokastër County, southern Albania. At the 2015 local government reform it became a subdivision of the municipality Këlcyrë. The population at the 2011 census was 1,256. The municipality consists of the villages Sukë, Goricë, Fshat i Ri, Rodenjë, Podgoran, Podgoran Fushë, Ujmirë, Zhepovë, Shelq, Topojan, Luar, Delilaj, Çorogunj and Taroninë.

References

Former municipalities in Gjirokastër County
Administrative units of Këlcyrë
Villages in Gjirokastër County